The Torneo Plácido Galindo was a knockout competition played by 42 football teams.

History

1989
The Torneo Plácido Galindo was played during the 1989 Copa América with only Peruvian Primera División teams. The 42 clubs were divided into 5 groups and the top teams advanced to the quarterfinals. Although Defensor Lima won the tournament, they qualified to Regional II's Liguilla Playoffs.

Champions

Titles by club

External links
1989 Torneo Placido Galindo
Peruvian Football League News 

Football competitions in Peru
1989 in Peruvian football
Defunct sports competitions in Peru

es:Torneo Plácido Galindo